Robert Ian McLellan (16 March 1916 – 11 April 2007) was an Australian rules footballer who played with Fitzroy in the Victorian Football League (VFL).

McLellan later served in the Australian Army during World War II, spending 9 months in Borneo in 1945.

Notes

External links 
		

1916 births
2007 deaths
Australian rules footballers from Melbourne
Fitzroy Football Club players
Australian Army personnel of World War II
People from Box Hill, Victoria
Military personnel from Melbourne